Chas S. Clifton (born 1951) is an American academic, author and historian who specialises in the fields of English studies and Pagan studies. Clifton currently holds a teaching position in English at Colorado State University-Pueblo, prior to which he taught at Pueblo Community College.

A practicing Pagan since the early 1970s, Clifton has written widely on the subject, in both a practical and an academic capacity, with a particular emphasis on the Pagan religion of Wicca. He has become a prominent figure in the field of Pagan studies, editing both the peer-reviewed academic journal The Pomegranate, and the Pagan Studies Series of academic books published by AltaMira Press. He also serves as co-chair of the American Academy of Religion's Pagan Studies Group.

Biography

Early life: 1951–1991
Clifton was born in 1951, and raised in the Anglican denomination of Christianity. Undertaking his undergraduate studies in English at Reed College in Portland, Oregon, during a summer vacation in 1972 he aided a teacher in the construction of an adobe house near Taos, New Mexico. Here, he read a copy of Robert Graves' The White Goddess; believing that it represented a "religion for poets", it sparked his interest in Paganism. Returning to Reed for his final year, he read more of Graves' work, producing his thesis – a book of poems entitled Queen Famine – under his influence. He self-initiated himself into Paganism through a rite found in Hans Holzer's book The New Pagans before moving to Colorado and joining a group of ceremonial magicians influenced by the Pagan religion of Thelema. The following year he joined a Witches' coven with "loose ties" to the 1734 Tradition alongside his partner Mary, and several years later they underwent a Pagan marriage ceremony.

Starting his own magazine, Iron Mountain: A Journal of Magical Religion in the mid-1980s, he also started a graduate degree in religious studies at the University of Colorado, moving from Manitou Springs to Boulder. Circa 1986, he became contributing editor for Gnosis: The Journal of Western Inner Traditions, through which he began corresponding with Evan John Jones and Felicitas Goodman, and began writing a syndicated column titled "Letter from Hardscrabble Creek".

Academic career: 1992–2012
Clifton began teaching in the English department at the University of Southern Colorado in 1992. With Jones, he co-wrote a book titled Sacred Mask, Sacred Dance (1997), after which they had planned a sequel, The Castle and the Cave: Further Steps in Traditional Witchcraft, but it never saw completion.

A member of the American Academy of Religion (AAR), he was involved in a 1997 meeting to discuss the possibility of setting up a specific AAR group to discuss Paganism; the AAR governing committee turned them down, believing that their work could be fitted into the New Religious Movements discussion group, but they successfully reapplied in 2004. Clifton and Jone Salomonsen became co-chairs.

In 2001, Clifton became editor of The Pomegranate, a scholarly journal devoted to Pagan studies then based in North America. Taking over the position from Fritz Muntean, who had co-founded the journal in 1996, together they searched for a new publisher, that year signing an agreement with Janet Joyce of the London-based company Equinox Publishing. Clifton proceeded to oversee a series of changes to the journal, transforming its subtitle from A New Journal of Neopagan Thought to The International Journal of Pagan Studies and implementing a peer review system for judging the papers submitted to it for publication.

In 2004, he published Her Hidden Children, making use of the mass of materials he had assembled over the years. It appeared as the first in the "Pagan Studies Series" published by AltaMira Press; first devised by an editor in the late 1990s, the series came to fruition under the co-editorship of Clifton and Wendy Griffin.
Clifton took an early retirement when his departmental head left, believing that the future would not be conducive to his research.

Bibliography 

'The Significance of Aradia.' In Aradia, or the Gospel of the Witches: A New Translation, edited by Mario Pazzaglini and Dina Pazzaglini, 59-80. Phoenix Publishing, 1998. .
 'Smokey and the Sacred: Nature Religion, Civil Religion, and American Paganism,' Ecotheology: The Journal of Religion, Nature and the Environment, 8(1) (August 2003): 50-60.

References

Footnotes

Bibliography

External links 
 
 Profile in Morganna Davies and Aradia Lynch, Keepers of the Flame, (2001) Olympian Press 
 Sean McCloud, Book review of Her Hidden Children: The Rise of Wicca and Paganism in America H-Net American Studies, September 2006.
 W. Michael Ashcraft. Book review of Her Hidden Children: The Rise of Wicca and Paganism in America. Magic, Ritual & Witchcraft, 2 (1) (Summer 2007): 82-84.
 W. Michael Ashcraft. Book review of The Paganism Reader. Nova Religio 11(1) (August 2007): 133-135.
 Jon P. Bloch. Book review of Her Hidden Children: The Rise of Wicca and Paganism in America. Journal for the Scientific Study of Religion, 47 (1) (March 2008):171–173
 Murph Pizza. book review of Her Hidden Children: The Rise of Wicca and Paganism in America. The Pomegranate: The International Journal of Pagan Studies 9(2) (2007): 200-201.
 Cliff Landis. Book review of Her Hidden Children: The Rise of Wicca and Paganism in America..  Cliff Landis Net, 10 January 2008.

Living people
Colorado State University faculty
American occult writers
Pagan studies scholars
1951 births
People from Manitou Springs, Colorado
Colorado State University Pueblo faculty
American Wiccans
Former Anglicans